The Latino American Dawah Organization (LADO) is a grassroots organization founded in September 1997 by a handful of Latino converts to Islam in New York City. The idea began with Samantha Sanchez who then recruited the help of Juan Alvarado and Saraji Umm Zaid and the group was formed. Later, the group leadership transferred to Juan Jose Galvan.  The organization's name was selected to express LADO's ethnic and religious identity as Latinos/Hispanics and as Muslims. LADO also wanted to emphasize that this would be an Islamic organization whose primary purpose would be dawah and education to Latinos. Today, the Latino American Dawah Organization is known by most Muslims as simply "LADO" and as "The LADO Group." In Spanish, LADO is known as "El Grupo LADO." The acronym LADO means 'side' in Spanish. The motto of the Latino American Dawah Organization is "¡Puro Latino! ¡Puro Islam! ¡A su LADO!" (meaning "Pure Latino! Pure Islam! At your side!").

LADO's activities
LADO members seek to aid all Muslims and non-Muslims by sharing Islam as expressed in its mission statement. LADO disseminates Islam by providing Islamic literature in the form of books, brochures, and other media in English, Spanish and whenever possible, Portuguese. Because few materials are available to the Spanish-speaking and Portuguese-speaking communities, LADO emphasizes this aspect of Islamic dawah. In addition to educating anyone about Islam, LADO will also guide whom they can to the right resources. LADO is committed to attending, visiting, and working with mosques, attending special Islamic events, interfaith talks, various lectures, translating existing literature, and writing articles and editorials among other things. Through these initiatives, LADO has not only become a network among Latino Muslims, but has also become a liaison between Latino Muslims and the general Muslim community.

References

External links
LADO Website
About LADO
HispanicMuslims.com

See also

 Latino Muslims
 Alianza Islámica
 Black Muslims
 Islam in the United States
 Latin American Muslims

Islamic organizations based in the United States
Hispanic and Latino American organizations
Islam in New York City
Hispanic and Latino American culture in New York City